Unsheltered may refer to:
the state of homelessness, especially homeless people not using homeless shelters
Unsheltered (novel)